José Pedro Gonçalves Taques (born March 15, 1968) is a Brazilian teacher and politician. He has previously as governor of Mato Grosso and senator for the same state.

References 

1968 births
People from Cuiabá
Governors of Mato Grosso
Living people
Democratic Labour Party (Brazil) politicians
Brazilian Social Democracy Party politicians
Solidariedade politicians
Members of the Federal Senate (Brazil)